The 1997–1998 campaign was the 92nd season in Atlético Madrid's history and their 63rd season in La Liga, the top division of Spanish football.

Season summary
Atlético Madrid failed to regain the title they had won in 1996 and finished the season in 7th place. One of the high points of the season was the club's run in the UEFA Cup, reaching the semi-finals. Striker Christian Vieri was the club's top scorer, scoring 24 goals in La Liga (he finished as the league's top scorer and was awarded the Pichichi Trophy) and 29 in all competitions, but transferred to Lazio (who knocked Atlético out of the UEFA Cup) at the end of the season.

Squad
Squad at end of season

Left club during season

Starting 11

Transfers

In
  Paulo Futre –  West Ham United
  Juninho –  Middlesbrough
  Christian Vieri –  Juventus
  Rade Bogdanović –  JEF United Ichihara

Out
  Santiago Ezquerro –  Mallorca
Winter
  Rade Bogdanović –  NAC Breda
  Roberto –  Espanyol, loan

La Liga

League table

Results by round

Matches

UEFA Cup

First round

Second round

Eightfinals

Quarterfinals

Semifinals

Copa del Rey

Second round

Statistics

Players statistics

Goal scorers

La Liga
 Christian Vieri 24

Copa del Rey

UEFA Cup
 Christian Vieri 5

Overall
 Christian Vieri 29

Results

See also
Atlético Madrid
1997–98 La Liga
1997–98 Copa del Rey
1997–98 UEFA Cup

References

1997-98
Spanish football clubs 1997–98 season